William Pierce "Buck" Astle (July 27, 1902 – December 1983) was an American football player, coach, and official.

Playing career
Astle played multiple sports at Emporia State University in Emporia, Kansas.  He has been inducted into the "Athletic Hall of Honor" at the school in three sports: football, basketball, and baseball.  At Emporia, he played under coach Homer Woodson Hargiss.

Coaching career
Astle the head football coach at McPherson College in McPherson, Kansas, serving for three seasons, from 1937 to 1939, and compiling a record of 9–15–3.

Officiating
After coaching, Astle continued to work as an official in multiple games, including the 1951 Central Missouri State vs. Southwestern football game and the 1961 Orange Bowl.

Head coaching record

References

1902 births
1983 deaths
American men's basketball players
College football officials
Emporia State Hornets baseball players
Emporia State Hornets basketball players
Emporia State Hornets football players
McPherson Bulldogs football coaches
People from Newton, Kansas